Francis Ramsey Lalor (November 14, 1856 – June 24, 1929) was a Canadian politician.

Born in St. Catharines, Canada West, Lalor was educated at the Durnville Public and High Schools. A merchant and manufacturer, he was first elected to the House of Commons of Canada for the electoral district of Haldimand at the general elections of 1904. A Conservative, he was re-elected in 1908, 1911, and 1917.

References
 
 The Canadian Parliament; biographical sketches and photo-engravures of the senators and members of the House of Commons of Canada. Being the tenth Parliament, elected November 3, 1904

1856 births
1929 deaths
Conservative Party of Canada (1867–1942) MPs
Members of the House of Commons of Canada from Ontario
Politicians from St. Catharines